Jean Maheu (24 January 1931 – 9 January 2022) was a French government official.

Life and career
Maheu was the son of Director-General of UNESCO René Maheu and Inès Allafort du Verger. He studied at the Lycée Claude Bernard in Paris and at the Lycée Pasteur in Neuilly-sur-Seine. He then took classes at Sciences Po and the École nationale d'administration. On 27 July 1956, he married Isabelle Viennot with whom he had six children: Emmanuel, Anne, Sophie, Pascale, Jean-Philippe and Delphine.

In 1958, Maheu began working for the Court of Audit and joined the  the following year. From 1962 to 1967, he served as  under Charles de Gaulle. He then served as a secretary to the Minister of Sports from 1967 to 1974.

He was active in the world of music, working for the Ministry of Culture as a lyricist and directing the Orchestre de Paris from 1974 to 1979. He was also vice-president of the Paris Opera. In 1983, he was named President of the Centre Pompidou, succeeding . In 1989, he was named Président-directeur général of Radio France, a position he held until 1995. As part of this mandate, he became a member of the Conseil supérieur de la langue française, a member of the board of directors of Agence France-Presse and a member of Public Francophone Radios.

Maheu was President of the Maison de la poésie de la Ville de Paris from 1995 to 1998. He then became President of the Board of Directors of the Théâtre de la Ville in 1996, President of the Centre national de la photographie in 1996, and President of the Association des Centres culturels de rencontres in 1997.

He was an associate professor at Sciences Po from 1959 to 1970, an associated professor at Paris-Sorbonne University from 1994 to 1997, and later an associate professor at the University of Évry Val d'Essonne.

Maheu died on 9 January 2022, at the age of 90.

Publications
Les Nus et les Trembles (1984)
Un été de sel (1989)
Le Ravissement de l'île (1992)
L'ébloui (2004)
Naissance du vertige (2009)

Decorations
Officer of the Legion of Honour
Grand Officer of the Ordre national du Mérite
Officer of the Ordre des Palmes académiques
Commander of the Ordre des Arts et des Lettres
Officer of the Order of Merit of the Federal Republic of Germany
Order of the Rising Sun

References

1931 births
2022 deaths
People from Paris
French chief executives
French civil servants
Lycée Pasteur (Neuilly-sur-Seine) alumni
Sciences Po alumni
École nationale d'administration alumni
Officiers of the Légion d'honneur
Grand Officers of the Ordre national du Mérite
Officiers of the Ordre des Palmes Académiques
Commandeurs of the Ordre des Arts et des Lettres
Officers Crosses of the Order of Merit of the Federal Republic of Germany
Recipients of the Order of the Rising Sun